Lord Wellington was launched in 1811 in Quebec and in 1812 changed her registry to London. She spent most of her career sailing between Great Britain and North America, though she spent her last few years as a coastal collier. In 1832 she was the site of an outbreak of cholera that killed several passengers and crew. She was last listed in 1844.

Career
Lord Wellington was launched at Quebec. A letter dated 9 March 1812 stated that she had been re-registered at London.

Lord Wellington first appeared in Lloyd's Register (LR) in 1812. Her master was Mitchell, her owner J.R. Cato, and her trade London–Quebec. The entry gave her burthen as 388 tons, a number that was eventually revised down by 100 or more tons.

On 18 February 1824 Lord Wellington, Maxwell, master, was sailing into Newry with a cargo of coal from Liverpool. Lord Wellington ran on shore at Cranfield Point. It was expected that she would be gotten off. A report from Liverpool dated 8 March stated that Lord Wellington, Maxwell, master, which had gone on shore at Carlingford Bay, had been gotten off without damage, and without suffering from leaks.

Cholera outbreak (1832): There were already reports of cholera in the Waterford area when Lord Wellington stopped at Passage East on 15 June 1832, a few days after she had embarked passengers at New Ross. A number of passengers alighted, stating that there was cholera aboard the ship. By the 17th several of the passengers who had left the ship were dead or ill, and several passengers or crew were also dead or ill. That day Lord Wellington sailed for Milford Haven, one of three ports designated for vessels requiring quarantine due to illness aboard. She left Milford Haven on 29 June to resume her voyage to Quebec. On 13 August Lord Wellington, Collaton, master, landed 167 immigrants at Quebec.

Fate
Lord Wellington was last listed in 1844.

Citations

1811 ships
Ships built in Quebec
Age of Sail merchant ships of England
Cholera outbreaks